Grant Township is one of 16 townships in Cerro Gordo County, Iowa, USA.  As of the 2000 census, its population was 354.

Grant Township was the site of the airplane crash north of the city of Clear Lake, in which rock and roll stars Buddy Holly, Ritchie Valens, and J.P. "The Big Bopper" Richardson, along with their pilot Roger A. Peterson, were killed on February 3, 1959. The site is located in the extreme eastern part of the township, near its border with Lincoln Township.

Geography
According to the USGS, it contains one cemetery, Grant. The city of Fertile borders it to the north.

References

External links
 US-Counties.com
 City-Data.com

Townships in Cerro Gordo County, Iowa
Mason City, Iowa micropolitan area
Townships in Iowa